Jimmy Rosario (born Angel Ramon (Ferrer) Rosario on 5 May 1945) is a former Major League Baseball center fielder. Rosario was signed as a free agent by the San Francisco Giants in 1965, and played two seasons with the team. After his release from the Giants in 1975, Rosario signed with the Milwaukee Brewers and played at the Major League level with them in 1976.

Defensively, in 583 innings in the field, Rosario handled 172 total chances (171 putouts, 1 assist) as an outfielder without an error for a perfect 1.000 fielding percentage in his major league career.

See also
 List of Major League Baseball players from Puerto Rico

References

External links

1945 births
Living people
Amarillo Giants players
Azules de Coatzacoalcos players
Crown Lighter Lions players
Decatur Commodores players
Fresno Giants players
Lexington Giants players
Lotte Orions players
Major League Baseball outfielders
Major League Baseball players from Puerto Rico
Milwaukee Brewers players
Nippon Professional Baseball outfielders
Sportspeople from Bayamón, Puerto Rico
Phoenix Giants players
Puerto Rican expatriate baseball players in Japan
Puerto Rican expatriate baseball players in Mexico
Sacramento Solons players
San Francisco Giants players
Saraperos de Saltillo players
Spokane Indians players
Tigres del México players
Waterbury Giants players